Peter Gallagher is an American actor.

Peter Gallagher may also refer to:

Peter Gallagher (comic strip artist), current writer of Heathcliff 
Peter Gallagher (rugby league, born 1937), Australian rugby league footballer of the 1950s and 1960s who played in Queensland and represented Australia
Peter Gallagher (rugby league), Australian rugby league footballer of the 1960s who played in New South Wales for Easts and Manly
Peter T. Gallagher, Irish astrophysicist